Pylephlebitis is an uncommon thrombophlebitis of the portal vein or any of its branches (i.e. a portal vein thrombosis) that is caused by infection. It is usually a complication of intra-abdominal sepsis, most often following diverticulitis, perforated appendicitis, or peritonitis. Considered uniformly lethal in the pre-antibiotic era, it still carries a mortality of 10-30%.

Presentation
It typically presents with fever, rigors, and right upper quadrant abdominal pain, but sometimes abdominal pain may be absent.  Liver function test abnormalities are usually present but frank jaundice is uncommon.

Cause
It is a cause of portal hypertension and can cause bowel ischemia sometimes leading to bowel infarction.

Diagnosis
In the modern era, it is usually diagnosed by CT scans of the abdomen and pelvis. Bacteriology is often polymicrobial and blood cultures are positive in some cases. A significant fraction of people presenting with this condition have an underlying hypercoagulable state.

Treatment
Treatment is with a prolonged course of broad-spectrum antibiotics, with the addition of anticoagulants if other clots are present outside the portal vein or if fever persists on antibiotic therapy.

References
 
 Kumar, V.; Abbas, A. K.; Fausto, N.; Robbins, S. L.;  Cotran, R. S. (2015). Robbins and Cotran Pathologic Basis of Disease, 9th ed.; Philadelphia: Elsevier Saunders.

Vascular diseases
Inflammations